Automolus is a genus of bird in the ovenbird family Furnariidae.

Taxonomy
The genus Automolus was introduced in 1853 by the German naturalist Ludwig Reichenbach to accommodate the taxon Sphenura sulphurascens Lichtenstein, now treated as a subspecies of the white-eyed foliage-gleaner. The name is from the Ancient Greek automolos meaning "deserter".

Species
The genus contains 10 species:
 Chestnut-crowned foliage-gleaner, Automolus rufipileatus
 Brown-rumped foliage-gleaner, Automolus melanopezus
 Buff-throated foliage-gleaner, Automolus ochrolaemus
 Chiriqui foliage-gleaner, Automolus exsertus – split from buff-throated foliage-gleaner
 Eastern woodhaunter,  Automolus subulatus – formerly in Hyloctistes (previously striped woodhaunter)
 Western woodhaunter,  Automolus virgatus – split from eastern woodhaunter
 Olive-backed foliage-gleaner, Automolus infuscatus
 Para foliage-gleaner, Automolus paraensis
 Pernambuco foliage-gleaner, Automolus lammi – split from white-eyed foliage-gleane 
 White-eyed foliage-gleaner, Automolus leucophthalmus

The tepui foliage-gleaner has been placed in this genus, but behavior, voice, and morphology all point to it belonging in Syndactyla, and molecular data confirmed this hypothesis.

The eastern woodhaunter was formerly placed in its own genus Hyloctistes but molecular evidence showed that it was nested in Automolus. The ruddy foliage-gleaner and the Santa Marta foliage-gleaner, formerly placed in Automolus, are actually more closely related to Clibanornis foliage-gleaners.

References

 
Bird genera
Taxonomy articles created by Polbot
Taxa named by Ludwig Reichenbach